The 2015–16 En Avant de Guingamp season is the 104th professional season of the club since its creation in 1912.

Players

French teams are limited to four players without EU citizenship. Hence, the squad list includes only the principal nationality of each player; several non-European players on the squad have dual citizenship with an EU country. Also, players from the ACP countries—countries in Africa, the Caribbean, and the Pacific that are signatories to the Cotonou Agreement—are not counted against non-EU quotas due to the Kolpak ruling.

Current squad
As of 8 January 2016.

Out on loan

Transfers

Transfers in

Loans in

Transfers out

Loans out

Pre-season & friendlies

Competitions

Ligue 1

League table

Results summary

Results by round

Matches

Coupe de la Ligue

Coupe de France

References

Guingamp
En Avant Guingamp seasons